Alessandra Fossati (born 30 September 1963) is a retired Italian high jumper.

Biography
She became Italian champion in 1986. Her personal best jump was 1.90 metres, achieved in February 1986 in Madrid.

Achievements

References

External links
 

1963 births
Living people
Athletes from Milan
Italian female high jumpers